Myrmex floridanus is a species of antlike weevil in the family Curculionidae. It is found in North America.

References

Further reading

External links

 

Curculioninae
Beetles described in 1892